Chandan Kumar Sarkar (died 19 November 2018) was an Indian politician and businessman  from Assam.He was the Minister of Irrigation and Soil Conservation in the Tarun Gogoi Ministry,Government of Assam from 2015 to 2016.He was also member of the Assam Legislative Assembly from Abhayapuri South constituency from 2011 to 2016,2001 to 2006 and again from 1991 to 1996.His son,Pradip Sarkar was also Member of the Assam Legislative Assembly since 2021 from Abhayapuri South constituency and his wife,Swapna Rani Sarkar was earlier the chairman of Abhayapuri Town Committee.

Early life and education 
Sarkar is the son of the late Bijoy Ch Sarkar. He read up to Class X, Chakla H.S.School, in 1974.

Political career 
Sarkar was the Indian National Congress candidate for Abhayapuri South in the 1991 Assam Legislative Assembly election , he received 22311 votes, 32.58% of the total vote.

In the 1996 Assam Legislative Assembly election, Sarkar received 16977 votes, 22.24% of the total vote. He lost to AGP candidate Rabin Banikya by 26572 votes.

In the 2001 Assam Legislative Assembly election, he received 45318 votes, 50.02% of the total vote and he again became MLA of Abhayapuri South. He defeated Banikya by 3633 votes.

In the 2006 Assam Legislative Assembly election, he received 26638 votes and again lost to Banikya by 4034 votes.

In the 2011 Assam Legislative Assembly election he was the Indian National Congress candidate again for Abhayapuri South, he defeated his nearest opponent by 15899 votes. On 23 January, in a cabinet reshuffle, Sarkar was made minister for Irrigation and Soil Conservation in the Tarun Gogoi cabinet.

In the 2016 Assam Legislative Assembly election, he lost to Ananta Kumar Malo by 191 votes. He was one of 10 cabinet ministers who lost in the election.

Personal life and death 
Sarkar and his wife had 2 sons and 1 daughter. His son Pradip, also became MLA for Abhayapuri South, in 2021.

On 19 November 2018, Sarkar suffered a cardiac arrest in Bongaigaon. He was immediately rushed to a local hospital where he later died.

Several politicians paid tribute to Sarkar such as Ripun Bora, Himanta Biswa Sarma and Chief Minister Sarbananda Sonowal. Sonowal said  “As a minister of the previous Congress government, Sarkar had rendered valuable services, which would always be remembered by the people and his death is an irreparable loss to society.”

References 

1950s births
2018 deaths
Assam MLAs 1991–1996
Assam MLAs 2001–2006
Assam MLAs 2011–2016
Assam politicians
People from Bongaigaon district
Year of birth uncertain
Indian National Congress politicians from Assam